Sohrab Fakir Manganhar, also known as Sohrab Fakir, (1934 – 23 October 2009) was a Sufi-singer from Sindh, Pakistan.

Early life
He was born in 1936 in Talpur Wada village of Kot Diji town, in Khairpur District. His father, Hammal Faqir, was an expert of tabla and sarangi. Suhrab Faqir was king of Sufi-music in Sindh and was considered one of the greatest mystic singers of Pakistan.

Suhrab Faqir was born in a musicians family which had migrated from Jaisalmer State of  Rajasthan, British India.

Career
Suhrab Faqir started learning tabla from Ustad Khursheed Ali Khan and his singing career  started in 1974, when he was asked by Ustad Manzoor Ali Khan to sing at the Urs celebration of Sakhi Allahyar near Tando Mohammad Khan. He was introduced to the radio at Radio Pakistan Khairpur by the renowned Sindhi writer Tanveer Abbasi, where he recorded two songs of Ghamdal Faqir including the song, Galyan Prem Nagar Diyan which became very popular throughout Sindh.

In the early 1980s, he formed a Sufi music group, Sung and became a disciple of Faqir Dur Mohammad Heesbani.

He had toured  Britain, Germany, Belgium, Netherlands, Norway and France where his artful singing was highly appreciated. He sang with other singers as well such as Jamal Faqir .

Popular songs
Ghund Khol Deedar Karao, Mein Aaya Mukh Waikhan
Galyan Prem Nagar Diyan

Awards and recognition
Shah Abdul Latif Bhittai Award
Sachal Sarmast Award
Pride of Performance Award by the President of Pakistan in 1999

Death
Suhrab Faqir died of kidney disease on 23 October 2009 at Talpur Wada near Kot Diji, Sindh, Pakistan. He had been ill for a long time. Earlier in August 2006, he was also hospitalized due to chest pain and for diabetic complications.

References

External links
Sindhi Music
Suhrab Faqir on YouTube

1936 births
2009 deaths
People from Khairpur District
People from Jaisalmer
Pakistani folk singers
Performers of Sufi music
Deaths from kidney disease
Sindhi people
20th-century Pakistani male singers
Sindhi-language singers
Singers from Sindh
Recipients of the Pride of Performance